Dennis Hewitt (born 22 November 1955) is a Guyanese cricketer. He played in five first-class and four List A matches for Guyana from 1979 to 1985.

See also
 List of Guyanese representative cricketers

References

External links
 

1955 births
Living people
Guyanese cricketers
Guyana cricketers
Sportspeople from Georgetown, Guyana